Hervé Marc (12 October 1903 – 24 December 1946) was a French footballer. He played in one match for the France national football team in 1930.

References

External links
 
 
 

1903 births
1946 deaths
French footballers
France international footballers
Place of birth missing
Association football midfielders
Stade Rennais F.C. players
FC Rouen players
Olympic footballers of France
Footballers at the 1928 Summer Olympics